Hurbaf (also Romanized as Hūrbāf) is a village in Tasuj Rural District, in the Central District of Kavar County, Fars Province, Iran. At the 2006 census, its population was 1,292, in 254 families.

References 

Populated places in Kavar County